Kelburne Hockey Club is a Scottish field hockey club, founded in 1969 and based in Paisley. Kelburne today operates five senior men's teams, three senior women's teams and numerous junior teams at all age group levels. The club has dominated Scottish domestic hockey in recent seasons. Kelburne HC has also supplied the Scottish National Team with the vast majority of the Gents' team as well as consistently being represented in the Scotland national ladies team. The club has also had success in Europe.

The club was founded in 1969. Since then Kelburne Hockey Club has developed into the most successful hockey club in Scotland. Since its formation at accommodation at Whitehaugh, Paisley, the club has flourished from being unfashionable to being the top hockey club in Scotland with very strong men's, ladies' and youth sections. This has been the result of many years of hard work based on a youth policy developing hockey skills at an early age. No other club has been able to so consistently produce home-grown players of the standard Kelburne has in recent times. One example of the success of this policy is Great Britain defender Emily Maguire, who learned her hockey with the club over 15 years from the age of 5, before moving south to train full-time with the GB squad.

The men's first team was the team of the 1990s, winning GB and Ireland Championship, four National League titles, Scottish Cup and European competitions. In season 1991–92 the club achieved the ‘Grand Slam of Scottish Hockey’ with all teams winning all SHU competitions entered, which is unique and has not been achieved by any other club.

After a gap, the current Kelburne team of the mid-2000s are emulating their predecessors and were the SHU team of the year in 2005 and 2007, also winning 5 National Leagues, 4 Scottish Cups, 2 SHU European Playoffs, EHF European Cup in Austria and EHF European Club Championship in Switzerland. 2006/07 was an outstanding season when the team completing their domestic season as 'Undefeated Team of Scottish Hockey’ with an unprecedented 100% perfect record with all games won.

In 2010 9 players from the club represented Scotland in the Commonwealth Games in Delhi.

Kelburne today operates five senior men's teams, 3 senior women's teams and numerous junior teams at all age group levels. This season 2013 / 2014 the Men's 1st XI won the Scottish National League for the 10th successive year. In the Euro Hockey League the men have competed 6 times with the best performance reaching the last 16 twice losing to Uhlenhorster, the eventual winners, to a golden goal. The women has competed for European competition for the first time in their history in Rome.

Current and past players continue to make up the bulk of the Senior Scottish Men's squad.

Notable players
Jonathan Christie
Michael Christie
Mark Ralph
Christopher Nelson
Alan Forsyth

Field hockey clubs established in 1969
Sport in Paisley, Renfrewshire
Scottish field hockey clubs
1969 establishments in Scotland